Edison Setlhomo K. Masisi (31 March 1921 – 14 February 2003) was a politician and diplomat in Botswana and he is the father of the current President of Botswana, Mokgweetsi Masisi. He served as member of parliament of Mosopa between 1965 and 1999. Masisi attended Tiger Kloof along with future president Quett Masire. After qualifying as a teacher, he taught at Moshupa (1950-1964), which he served as head teacher (1957-1964). In 1964, he resigned to contest the Moshupa seat on the BDP ticket. The following year, he won in the election and was appointed as assistant Minister of Education, Labour and Social Services. He served as the second minister of state for Foreign Affairs in the Office of the President from 1969–1971. He was moved to the Ministry of Education in 1972 and later or Ministry of Health (1978-1979). In 1989, he was elected as the deputy speaker of the National Assembly, where remained in the position until 1999. In 1993, he was appointed as assistant Minister of Finance and Development Planning. He retired from active politics in 1999.

References

1921 births
2003 deaths
Foreign Ministers of Botswana
Botswana diplomats
Government ministers of Botswana
People from Moshupa